Turkish Jews in Israel are immigrants and descendants of the immigrants of the Turkish Jewish communities, who now reside within the State of Israel. They number around 100,000-150,000.

History

Ottoman Palestine
For centuries, the Jewish population of Ottoman Palestine was divided between two groups: Jewish subjects of the Turkish Sultan, who formed their own legal entity, and foreign pilgrims who lived largely on alms. During Ottoman times, the Jewish presence was concentrated to four cities.

Immigration history from Republic of Turkey
The immigration history of the Turkish Jews in Israel when the Republic of Turkey was established in 1923, Aliyah was not particularly popular amongst Turkish Jewry; migration from Turkey to Palestine was minimal in the 1920s.

Between 1923 and 1948, approximately 7,300 Jews emigrated from Turkey to Mandatory Palestine. After the 1934 Thrace pogroms following the 1934 Turkish Resettlement Law, immigration to Palestine increased; it is estimated that 521 Jews left for Palestine from Turkey in 1934 and 1,445 left in 1935. Immigration to Palestine was organized by the Jewish Agency and the Palestine Aliya Anoar Organization. The Varlık Vergisi, a capital tax which occurred in 1942, was also significant in encouraging emigration from Turkey to Palestine; between 1943 and 1944, 4,000 Jews emigrated.

The Jews of Turkey reacted very favorably to the creation of the State of Israel. Between 1948 and 1951, 34,547 Jews immigrated to Israel, nearly 40% of the Jewish population at the time. Immigration was stunted for several months in November 1948, when Turkey suspended migration permits as a result of pressure from neighboring Arab countries.

In March 1949, the suspension was removed when Turkey officially recognized Israel, and emigration continued, with 26,000 emigrating within the same year. The migration was entirely voluntary, and was primary driven by economic factors given the majority of emigrants were from the lower classes. In fact, the migration of Jews to Israel is the second largest mass emigration wave out of Turkey, the first being the Population exchange between Greece and Turkey.when most of them arrived to Israel As with many other Jews from the Middle east and North Africa  they were put into Transit camps or Ma'abarot.

After 1951, emigration of Jews from Turkey to Israel slowed materially.

In the mid 1950s, 10% of those who had moved to Israel returned to Turkey. A new synagogue, the Neve Şalom was constructed in Istanbul in 1951. Generally, Turkish Jews in Israel have integrated well into society and are not distinguishable from other Israelis. However, they maintain their Turkish culture and connection to Turkey, and are strong supporters of close relations between Israel and Turkey.

In recent years during the rule of Recep Tayyip Erdogan and deteriorating relations between Turkey and Israel, rising anti-Semitism, perceived threats to the personal security of Jews in Turkey and rising anti-Jewish discrimination from Turkish society caused a new wave of emigration from Turkey to Israel.

Notable people

Adi Ashkenazi (born 1975), Israeli actress, comedian and television host
Lior Ashkenazi (born 1968), Israeli actor, comedian and television presenter.
Aki Avni (born 1967), Israeli actor and television presenter.
Pini Balili (born 1979), Israeli footballer
Yasmin Levy (born 1975), Israeli-Spanish singer-songwriter of Judeo-Spanish music.
Tamir Pardo (born 1953), former Mossad director
Erol Güney (born 1914–2009), journalist and author.
Berry Sakharof (born 1957) is an Israeli rock guitarist, singer, songwriter and producer
Rona Ramon (1964-2018) Israeli educator, widow of first Israeli astronaut Ilan Ramon.

See also 
 History of the Jews in Turkey
 Aliyah
 Turkish Jews
 History of the Jews in the Ottoman Empire
 Old Yishuv
 Pre-Zionist Aliyah
 Kurdish Jews in Israel
 Arkadaş Association
 Jewish ethnic divisions
 Turks in Israel

References 

 

Israeli Jews by national origin
Turkish Jews